lMule (short for "Linux Mule") was an early attempt to bring an eMule-like client to Linux started in January 2003 by Timo Kujala, who ported all eMule code to Linux by himself. Alternative applications were at the time command line applications whilst lMule was very similar to eMule in look and feel.

The development team grew during the short lifespan of the project, but in June 2003, due to differences between the developers and the hijacking of the website by one contributor, the fork xMule was born, where the initial "x" was supposed to mean the multiplatform goals of the project (this claim was much later changed by xMule maintainer to "X11 mule"). Timo Kujala and the other lMule developers not part of xMule project abandoned all development after this event. The developers fell out with one another again, spawning the fork aMule, meaning "another Mule" at the time it was started, then changed to "All-platform Mule" after some time.

While the lMule project was completely dropped, the xMule was abandoned on 2006, and the aMule project continues in active development.

See also

 aMule

External links
 

File sharing software
Discontinued software
2003 software
EDonkey Clients for Linux
File sharing software that uses wxWidgets